Esperantina is a municipality in the state of Tocantins in the Northern region of Brazil.

See also
List of municipalities in Tocantins

References

Municipalities in Tocantins